Malory Towers is a musical based on the series of children's books of the same name by Enid Blyton. It is adapted by Emma Rice and composed by Ian Ross.

Production 
The musical is the second production from Emma Rice's theatre company Wise Children. It opened at The Passenger Shed in Bristol from 19 July to 18 August 2019 before touring to Cambridge Arts Theatre (4 to 7 September), York Theatre Royal (10 to 14 September), Exeter Northcott Theatre (17 to 21 September), HOME Manchester (24 to 28 September) and Oxford Playhouse (1 to 5 October).

The production was scheduled to begin a UK tour in spring 2020, however this has had to be postponed due to the COVID-19 pandemic. The tour was also scheduled to run at the Southbank Centre, London from 2 July to 31 August 2020.

Cast and characters

External links 

 Page on Wise Children site

References 

2019 musicals
British musicals
Musicals based on novels